Practical Jokers is a 1938 Our Gang short comedy film directed by George Sidney.  It was the 174th Our Gang short (175th episode, 86th talking short, 87th talking episode, and sixth MGM produced episode) that was released.

Plot
Hoping to get even for all the practical jokes perpetrated by neighborhood troublemaker Butch, the Gang plans to sabotage Butch's birthday party. The weapon of choice is a firecracker, which is substituted for one of the birthday candles. Unfortunately, the kids in general and Alfalfa in particular are unable to escape from the party before the big (and tasty) explosion.

Cast

The Gang
 Darla Hood as Darla
 Eugene Lee as Porky
 George McFarland as Spanky
 Carl Switzer as Alfalfa
 Billie Thomas as Buckwheat

Additional cast
 Tommy Bond as Butch
 Gary Jasgur as Gary
 Sidney Kibrick as Woim
 Leonard Landy as Leonard
 Marie Blake as Butch's mother
 Grace Bohanon as Party extra
 Joe Levine as Party extra

See also
 Our Gang filmography

References

External links
 
 

1938 films
1938 comedy films
American black-and-white films
Films directed by George Sidney
Metro-Goldwyn-Mayer short films
Our Gang films
1938 short films
1930s American films